The 1993 Bowling Green Falcons football team was an American football team that represented Bowling Green University in the Mid-American Conference (MAC) during the 1993 NCAA Division I-A football season. In their third season under head coach Gary Blackney, the Falcons compiled a 6–3–2 record (5–1–2 against MAC opponents), finished in third place in the MAC, and outscored their opponents by a combined total of 268 to 173.

The team's statistical leaders included Ryan Henry with 2,243 passing yards, Zeb Jackson with 952 rushing yards, and Rameir Martin with 876 receiving yards.

Schedule

References

Bowling Green
Bowling Green Falcons football seasons
Bowling Green Falcons football